Pelczar is a surname. Notable people with the surname include:

 Józef Sebastian Pelczar (1842–1924), Polish Roman Catholic bishop
 Kazimierz Pelczar (1894–1943), Polish academic and physician

Occupational surnames